Deh Raqeh-ye Pir Hoseyn (also Romanized as Deh Raqeh-ye Pīr Ḩoseyn; also known as Deh-e Reqā, Deh-i-Reqa, Deh Raqā, Dehraqeh-ye Mīrḩoseyn, Deh Raqqa, Diyeh Ragheh, and Dīyeh Raqqeh) is a village in Najafabad Rural District, in the Central District of Bijar County, Kurdistan Province, Iran. At the 2006 census, its population was 138, in 31 families. The village is populated by Kurds.

References 

Towns and villages in Bijar County
Kurdish settlements in Kurdistan Province